A hurricane warning may refer to

 Hurricane force wind warning, by the US National Weather Service
 Tropical cyclone warnings and watches